Lukáš Stratil (born 29 January 1994) is a Czech football player who currently plays for Viktoria Plzeň. He has represented his country at youth international level.

References

External links
 
 

1994 births
Living people
People from Uherské Hradiště
Czech footballers
Czech Republic youth international footballers
Czech Republic under-21 international footballers
Czech First League players
1. FK Příbram players
FC Viktoria Plzeň players
FK Frýdek-Místek players
Association football forwards
Sportspeople from the Zlín Region